Mangifera foetida (also called horse mango, malmut, limus, bachang and machang) is a species of plant in the family Anacardiaceae. It is found in wet-land rainforest regions of Indonesia, Malaysia, Myanmar, Singapore, Thailand, and Vietnam. 

The fruit is edible.  However, young fruits extrude sap that can cause blisters. Mature fruits have a strong smell.

References

 Our Tropical Garden. Bachang (Mangifera foetida)

foetida
Trees of Indo-China
Trees of Malesia
Least concern plants
Taxonomy articles created by Polbot